Nicolae Tătaru (16 December 1931 – 1 August 2001), also known as Tătaru I, was a Romanian footballer. He played eleven years for Steaua București, being one of the symbols of the team. He played as a left forward. He was the older brother of Gheorghe Tătaru who also played professional football at Steaua București.

Playing career
Nicolae Tătaru signed with Steaua București in 1952, after three months when he played for one of Steaua's second teams, Armata Craiova. He was a part of Steaua's Golden team, playing also for the Romania national football team. He earned 21 caps for Romania, scoring two goals. His debut for the national team came on 9 May 1954, when Romania won the match against East Germany, played at Berlin in front of 90,000 people. He scored his first international goal, against Greece, in 1957.
In 1959, in the match against the olympic team of the Soviet Union, he was the captain of the national team. Since then he was eight times the captain of the national team. In his last match for Romania, in which he was also the captain, Romania lost the friendly match against Morocco. At Steaua, he played 210 matches and scored 75 goals. He is tenth in the Top Ten list of Steaua's goalscorers.

Manager career
Tătaru managed several clubs, like CS Târgovişte, FC Brăila, Petrolul Târgovişte or Steaua's youth team.

Honours

Player
Steaua București
Romanian League (4):  1953, 1956, 1960, 1961
Romanian Cup (2): 1955, 1962

References

External links
 Profile  at Steauafc.com 
 
 
 

1931 births
2001 deaths
Sportspeople from Sibiu
Romanian footballers
Association football forwards
Romania international footballers
Olympic footballers of Romania
Liga I players
FC Steaua București players
Romanian football managers
AFC Dacia Unirea Brăila managers
CSM Flacăra Moreni managers